Lentner Township is an inactive township in Shelby County, in the U.S. state of Missouri.

Lentner Township was erected in the 1897, and named after the community of Lentner, Missouri.

References

Townships in Missouri
Townships in Shelby County, Missouri